The Kalasasaya (also: Kalassasaya; kala for stone; saya or sayasta for standing up) or Stopped Stones is a major archaeological structure that is part of Tiwanaku, an ancient archeological complex in the Andes of western Bolivia that is designated as a UNESCO World Heritage Site.

The Kalasasaya is a low platform mound with a large courtyard, which is surrounded by high stone walls. The Kalasasaya is about 120 by 130 meters in dimension and aligned to the cardinal directions. Like the other platform mounds within Tiwanaku, it has a central sunken court. This sunken court can be reached by a monumental staircase through an opening in its eastern wall. The walls are composed of sandstone pillars that alternated with sections of smaller blocks of Ashlar masonry. This wall has been reconstructed in modern times. From 1957-1960 excavations took place at the site where all 4 walls were reconstructed along with the entrance gate.

The Kalasasaya dates to at least 200 BCE - 200 CE. It is located to the north of the Akapana and west of the Semi-Subterranean Temple, other structures in the complex.

References

External links 

 Sharing Bolivia: Temple of Kalasasaya
 Britannica: Tiwanaku

Buildings and structures in La Paz Department (Bolivia)
Tourist attractions in La Paz Department (Bolivia)
1st-millennium BC establishments
Archaeological sites in Bolivia
Andean civilizations
World Heritage Sites in Bolivia
Tiwanaku culture